Bill Roper (born March 27, 1965) is an American video game designer and producer. He is a co-founder and the current Chief Creative Officer at AuthorDigital / Arcadia Games. Previously, he was Chief Creative Officer at Improbable. Roper was Vice President/GM at Disney Interactive Studios from 2011–2016, and headed video game studios and creative and development departments for two decades, including divisions at Blizzard Entertainment, Flagship Studios, and Cryptic Studios. He is also an accomplished musician, and a founding member of the folk band The Poxy Boggards.

Career
Roper worked at Blizzard North and Blizzard Entertainment from 1994 to 2003, and was Vice President at Blizzard North at the time of his departure. He served in senior production and design capacities on the Warcraft, StarCraft, and Diablo series. He also provided voice-over talent for numerous games.

After his departure from Blizzard, Roper co-founded and held the position of CEO for Flagship Studios, the developer of Hellgate: London and Mythos (which was later released by HanbitSoft). In early 2008, amidst rumors of layoffs within the company, the company dissolved and lost the rights to both Mythos and Hellgate: London to Hanbitsoft and Comerica respectively, after it secured financing with Texas-based Comerica Bank to support the continuing development of its franchises. HanbitSoft currently owns the intellectual property rights to Mythos and Hellgate: London.

In November 2008 Roper joined Cryptic Studios as Design Director and Executive Producer of their newest project, Champions Online. In March 2010, Roper was promoted to Chief Creative Officer of Cryptic, replacing Jack Emmert after the latter transitioned to the role of Chief Operations Officer. On August 16, 2010, Roper announced his departure from Cryptic Studios to join Disney.

Roper was brought on to head the Marvel Franchise games created by Disney Interactive. He was then promoted to VP/GM, Core Games when Alex Seropian left Disney. While in this role, his Core Games group released Epic Mickey 2: The Power of Two, Fantasia: Music Evolved, and Disney Infinity, the latter quickly rising to high levels of critical and commercial success.

Roper was formerly Chief Creative Officer at Improbable.

Honors
Roper was named #41 in IGN's Top 100 Game Creators of All Time.

Game Titles
Roper has worked on the following titles:

 Blackthorne (1994) - Music
 Warcraft: Orcs & Humans (1994) - Producer, Voiceover, Documentation
 Warcraft II: Tides of Darkness (1995) - Design, Narration, Voiceover, Documentation
 Warcraft II: Beyond the Dark Portal (1996) - Executive Producer, Story Consultant, Narration, Voiceover
 Diablo (1997) - Producer, Voice Production, Casting & Directing, Story, Voiceover, Documentation, Strike Team
 StarCraft (1998) - Producer, Voiceover, Documentation, Strike Team
 StarCraft: Brood War (1998) - Executive Producer, Voiceover, Caterer, Documentation
 Warcraft II: Battle.net Edition (1999) - Producer
 Diablo II (2000) - Senior Producer, Voice Casting, Voiceover, Strike Team
 Diablo II: Lord of Destruction (2001) - Global Launch Team, Strike Team
 Warcraft III: Reign of Chaos (2002) - Voiceover, Strike Team
 Warcraft III: The Frozen Throne (2003) - Voiceover
 Hellgate: London (2007) - CEO
 Champions Online (2009) - Design Director, Executive Producer
 Star Trek Online (2010) - Design Director
 Avengers Initiative (2012) - VP/GM Product Development, Core Games
 Epic Mickey 2: The Power of Two (2012) - VP/GM Product Development, Core Games
 Disney Infinity (2013) - VP/GM Product Development, Core Games
 Fantasia: Music Evolved (2014) - VP/GM Product Development, Core Games
 Disney Infinity 2.0 (2014) - VP/GM Product Development, Core Games
 Disney Infinity 3.0 (2015) - VP/GM Product Development, Core Games

References

External links
 
 Interview with Bill Roper
 Bio at MobyGames
 Interview on the closing of Flagship Studios
 July '03 Interview with GameSpy.com

1965 births
Living people
American casting directors
American video game designers
American video game directors
American video game producers
American voice directors
American male video game actors
American male voice actors
Blizzard Entertainment people
Disney people
People from Concord, California